(international English title: Cascade Street) is the second studio album by the musician and composer Yann Tiersen.  It was released through Sine Terra Firma in 1996, and subsequently reissued in 1998, 2001, and 2009 through Ici, d'ailleurs... and Virgin Records in CD and double LP formats.  The album, with the exclusion of two pieces, "Naomi" and "La Vie quotidienne", is a collection of short pieces recorded with toy piano, harpsichord, violin, accordion, mandolin, and other conventional and unconventional musical instruments such as an old typewriter in "Pas si simple".  The title track, which was used about one year later for the film score of the Palme d'Or nominated French drama film The Dreamlife of Angels, was sung by French soloist singer Claire Pichet, who also provided vocals on the track "Naomi", a song that features words from Allen Ginsberg's poem "Kaddish".  François-Xavier Schweyer played the cello on "C'était ici" and "La Fenêtre".  Three tracks, "J'y suis jamais allé", "Pas si simple", and "Soir de fête", would find a wider audience five years later when they were featured on the soundtrack to Jean-Pierre Jeunet's acclaimed film Amélie.

Track listing
Music and lyrics by Yann Tiersen, except on "Naomi", which also has words from Allen Ginsberg's "Kaddish".

 "J'y suis jamais allé" - 1:35
 "Rue des cascades" - 4:02 (sung by Claire Pichet)
 "Pas si simple" - 1:54
 "Comptine d'été n° 2" - 2:13
 "Comptine d'été n° 3" - 1:53
 "Déjà loin" - 2:53
 "La Chambre" - 1:48
 "Mouvement introductif" - 2:22
 "La Muette" - 3:35
 "Naomi" - 4:06 (sung by Claire Pichet)
 "Soir de fête" - 2:54
 "Le Vieux en veut encore" - 1:44
 "Toujours là" - 1:10
 "C'était ici" - 1:38
 "Prière n° 2" - 1:27
 "Comptine d'été n° 1" - 2:17
 "La Fenêtre" - 2:50
 "Prière n° 3" - 1:03
 "La Pièce vide" - 1:42
 "La Vie quotidienne" - 7:36

Personnel

Musicians
 Yann Tiersen – violin, accordion, mandolin, bells, harpsichord, piano, old typewriter, strings, banjo, guitar, marmites, melodica, handclaps, toy piano, small pipe, music box
 Claire Pichet – vocals on "Rue des cascades" and "Naomi" 
 François-Xavier Schweyer – cello on "C'était ici" and "La Fenêtre"

Production
 Yann Tiersen – engineering, mixing
 François Dietz – engineering, mixing
 Frank Loriou – artwork
 Jo Pinto-Maïa – photography

Charts

References

1996 albums
Yann Tiersen albums